Arne Fredrik Høivik (9 January 1932 – 16 March 2017) was a Norwegian footballer. He played for Eik-Tønsberg his entire career, including several seasons in the top Norwegian league, which were crowned with a league silver in 1960 and league bronze in 1961. He was capped four times for the Norwegian national team, scoring once.

References

External links 
 

1932 births
2017 deaths
Sportspeople from Tønsberg
Norwegian footballers
Norway youth international footballers
Norway international footballers
Eik-Tønsberg players
Eliteserien players
Association football midfielders
Norwegian First Division players